Sympycnodes rhaptodes is a species of moth of the family Cossidae. It is found in Australia, where it has been recorded from Victoria to Queensland and possibly the Northern Territory. It is found in a wide range of habitats, including subalpine areas, as well as wet and dry sclerophyll forests.

The wingspan is 24–41 mm for males and 37–54 mm for females. The forewings are covered in pale brownish-grey scales with groups of dark brown scales. The hindwings are uniform fuscous. Adults have been recorded on wing from November to March.

References

Moths described in 1942
Zeuzerinae